William Spence (1846–1926) was an Australian trade union leader and politician.

William Spence may also refer to:

William Spence (burgess), Virginia colonist and member of House of Burgesses
William Spence (engineer), engineer and iron founder of the Cork Street Foundry, Dublin
William Spence (entomologist) (c. 1783–1860), British economist and entomologist
William Spence (mathematician) (1777–1815), Scottish mathematician
William Spence (sculptor) (1793-1849), English sculptor based in Liverpool
William Spence (MP), MP for Sussex
William Spence (architect) (1806–1883), Scottish architect 
William Blundell Spence (1814–1900), English artist and art dealer
William Robert Spence (1875–1954), Scottish trade union leader
William Wallace Spence (1815–1915), Baltimore financier
William Spence (schoolmaster), 17th-century Scottish schoolmaster imprisoned for teaching Presbyterianism
William Spence (footballer), English footballer

See also
Bill Spence (disambiguation)